Qi Jianguo (born August 1952) is a retired general of the Chinese People's Liberation Army. He served as Deputy Chief of the Joint Staff from 2012 to 2016. He formerly served as Commander of the 12th Group Army. A participant in the Sino-Vietnamese conflicts, he is one of the few serving PLA generals with battle experience.

Biography
Qi Jianguo was born in August 1952 in Wendeng, Shandong Province. In his early years he worked as a sent-down youth in Dengzhou, Henan Province. He joined the PLA in 1970, and graduated from PLA Nanjing Army Commander College (南京陆军指挥学院) with a bachelor's degree.

Qi joined the PLA as an ordinary soldier and rose through the army ranks. He was a battalion commander at the Battle of Laoshan during the Sino-Vietnamese conflicts. He is one of the few serving generals of the PLA with actual battle experience.

Qi served as Commander of the 12th Group Army from 2002 to 2005, Director of Combat of the Joint Staff Department from 2005 to 2008, Assistant to the Chief of Joint  Staff from 2009 to 2012, and was promoted to Deputy Chief of Joint  Staff in 2012. He was also head of the China International Institute for Strategic Society, with responsibility for military intelligence and diplomacy, until being replaced by Sun Jianguo, a fellow Deputy Chief of Joint  Staff, in 2013. Qi was one of the military commanders of the relief efforts after the 2008 Sichuan earthquake.

Qi attained the rank of major general in March 2002, lieutenant general in July 2010, and full general in July 2014. He is serving as deputy chief Joint Staff, since 2014. He is a full member of the 18th Central Committee of the Communist Party of China (2012−2017).

References

1952 births
Living people
People's Liberation Army generals from Shandong
People from Wendeng
Members of the 18th Central Committee of the Chinese Communist Party